Jānis Polis (25 June 1938 – 12 April 2011) was a Soviet and Latvian pharmacologist and the developer of one of the first methods of synthesis of rimantadine, which was discovered in 1963 by William W. Prichard of Du Pont & Co. He was born in Eleja parish, Latvia. On 6 February 2009, Polis was awarded the WIPO Award for Outstanding Inventors. Polis died in Riga, Latvia on 12 April 2011 at the age of 72.

References

Further reading 
 

1938 births
2011 deaths
20th-century Latvian inventors
Soviet inventors
Latvian people in health professions
Latvian scientists
Pharmacologists
People from Jelgava Municipality
Riga Technical University alumni
Soviet chemists